Dorcadion boluense is a species of beetle in the family Cerambycidae. It was described by Stephan von Breuning in 1962.

Subspecies
 Dorcadion boluense boluense Breuning, 1962
 Dorcadion boluense corallinum Pesarini & Sabbadini, 1998
 Dorcadion boluense imitator Pesarini & Sabbadini, 1998

References

boluense
Beetles described in 1962